Bryotropha figulella is a moth of the family Gelechiidae. It is found along the Atlantic coast of France and the coasts of the Mediterranean Sea, including Algeria and Libya. There is a dubious record from Great Britain.

The wingspan is 11–16 mm. The forewings are ochreous grey, mottled with variable amounts of white, greyish brown and fuscous. The hindwings are very pale at the base, but darker at the apex. Adults have been recorded on wing from late April to early October probably in two generations per year.

The larvae possibly feed on Silene nicaeensis.

References

Moths described in 1859
figulella
Moths of Europe
Moths of Africa